The British Science Association (BSA) is a charity and learned society founded in 1831 to aid in the promotion and development of science. Until 2009 it was known as the British Association for the Advancement of Science (BA). The current Chief Executive is Katherine Mathieson. The BSA's mission is to get more people engaged in the field of science by coordinating, delivering, and overseeing different projects that are suited to achieve these goals. The BSA "envisions a society in which a diverse group of people can learn and apply the sciences in which they learn." and is managed by a professional staff located at their Head Office in the Wellcome Wolfson Building. The BSA offers a wide variety of activities and events that both recognize and encourage people to be involved in science. These include the British Science Festival, British Science Week, the CREST Awards, Huxley Summit, Media Fellowships Scheme, along with regional and local events.

History

Foundation

The Association was founded in 1831 and modelled on the German Gesellschaft Deutscher Naturforscher und Ärzte. It was founded during post-war reconstruction after the Peninsula war to improve the advancement of science in England. The prime mover (who is regarded as the main founder) was Reverend William Vernon Harcourt, following a suggestion by Sir David Brewster, who was disillusioned with the elitist and conservative attitude of the Royal Society. Charles Babbage, William Whewell and J. F. W. Johnston are also considered to be founding members. The first meeting was held in York (at the Yorkshire Museum) on Tuesday 27 September 1831 with various scientific papers being presented on the following days. It was chaired by Viscount Milton, President of the Yorkshire Philosophical Society, and "upwards of 300 gentlemen" attended the meeting. The Preston Mercury recorded that those gathered consisted of "persons of distinction from various parts of the kingdom, together with several of the gentry of Yorkshire and the members of philosopher societies in this country". The newspaper published the names of over a hundred of those attending and these included, amongst others, eighteen clergymen, eleven doctors, four knights, two Viscounts and one Lord.

From that date onwards a meeting was held annually at a place chosen at a previous meeting. In 1832, for example, the meeting was held in Oxford, chaired by Reverend Dr William Buckland. By this stage the Association had four sections: Physics (including Mathematics and Mechanical Arts), Chemistry (including Mineralogy and Chemical Arts), Geology (including Geography) and Natural History.

During this second meeting, the first objects and rules of the Association were published. Objects included systematically directing the acquisition of scientific knowledge, spreading this knowledge as well as discussion between scientists across the world, and to focus on furthering science by removing obstacles to progress. The rules established included what constituted a member of the Association, the fee to remain a member, and the process for future meetings. They also include dividing the members into different committees. These committees separated members into their preferred subject matter, and were to recommend investigations into areas of interest, then report on these findings, as well as progress in their science at the annual meetings.

Additional sections were added throughout the years by either splitting off part of an original section, like making Geography and Ethnology its own section apart from Geology in 1851, or by defining a new subject area of discussion, such as Anthropology in 1869.

A very important decision in the Association's history was made in 1842 when it was resolved to create a "physical observatory".   A building that became well known as the Kew Observatory was taken on for the purpose and Francis Ronalds was chosen as the inaugural Honorary Director.  Kew Observatory quickly became one of the most renowned meteorological and geomagnetic observatories in the world. The Association relinquished control of the Kew Observatory in 1871 to the management of the Royal Society, after a large donation to grant the observatory its independence.

In 1872, the Association purchased its first central office in London, acquiring four rooms at 22 Albemarle Street. This office was intended to be a resource for members of the Association.

One of the most famous events linked to the Association Meeting was an exchange between Thomas Henry Huxley and Bishop Samuel Wilberforce in 1860 (see the 1860 Oxford evolution debate). Although it is often described as a "debate", the exchange occurred after the presentation of a paper by Prof Draper of New York, on the intellectual development of Europe with relation to Darwin's theory (one of a number of scientific papers presented during the week) and the subsequent discussion involved a number of other participants (although Wilberforce and Huxley were the most prominent). Although a number of newspapers made passing references to the exchange, it was not until later that it was accorded greater significance in the evolution debate.

Electrical standards
One of the most important contributions of the British Association was the establishment of standards for electrical usage: the ohm as the unit of electrical resistance, the volt as the unit of electrical potential, and the ampere as the unit of electrical current. A need for standards arose with the submarine telegraph industry. Practitioners came to use their own standards established by wire coils: "By the late 1850s, Clark, Varley, Bright, Smith and other leading British cable engineers were using calibrated resistance coils on a regular basis and were beginning to use calibrated condensers as well."

The undertaking was suggested to the BA by William Thomson, and its success was due to the use of Thomson's mirror galvanometer. Josiah Latimer Clark and Fleeming Jenkin made preparations. Thomson, with his students, found that impure copper, contaminated with arsenic, introduced significant extra resistance. The chemist Augustus Matthiessen contributed an appendix (A) to the final 1873 report that showed temperature-dependence of alloys.
The natural relation between these units are clearly, that a unit of electromotive force between two points of a conductor separated by a unit of resistance shall produce unit current, and that this current in a unit of time convey a unit quantity of electricity.
The unit system was "absolute" since it agreed with previously accepted units of work, or energy:
The unit current of electricity, in passing through a conductor of unit resistance, does a unit of work or its equivalent in a unit of time.

Other
The Association introduced the British Association (usually termed "BA") screw threads, a series of screw thread standards in sizes from 0.25 mm up to 6 mm, in 1882. The standards were based on the metric system, although they had to be re-defined in imperial terms for use by UK industry.  The standard was modified in 1884 to restrict significant figures for the metric counterpart of diameter and pitch of the screw in the published table, as well as not designating screws by their number of threads per inch, and instead giving an approximation due to considerable actual differences in manufactured screws.

In 1878 a committee of the Association recommended against constructing Charles Babbage's analytical engine, due to concerns about the current state of the machine's lack of complete working drawings, the machine's potential cost to produce, the machine's durability during repeated use, how and what the machine will actually be utilized for, and that more work would need to be done to bring the design up to a standard at which it is guaranteed to work.

The Association was parodied by English novelist Charles Dickens as 'The Mudfog Society for the Advancement of Everything' in The Mudfog Papers (1837–38).

In 1903, microscopist and astronomer Washington Teasdale died whilst attending the annual meeting.

Perception of science in the UK
The Association's main aim is to improve the perception of science and scientists in the UK. Membership is open to all.

At the beginning of the Great Depression, the Association's focus began to shift their purpose to account for not only scientific progress, but the social aspects of such progress. In the Association's 1931 meeting, the president General Jan Christiaan Smuts ended his address by the proposal of linking science and ethics together but provided no means to actuate his ideas. In the following years, debate began as to whom the responsibilities of scientists fell upon. The Association adopted a resolution in 1934 that dedicated efforts to better balance scientific advancement with social progress.

J.D. Bernal, a member of the Royal Society and the British Association, wrote The Social Function of Science in 1939, describing a need to correctly utilize science for society and the importance of its public perception. The idea of the public perception of science was furthered in 1985 when the Royal Society published a report titled The Public Understanding of Science. 

In the report, a committee of the Royal Society determined that it was scientists' duty to communicate to and educate the public. Lord George Porter, then president of the Royal Society, British Association, and Director of the Royal Institution, created the Committee on the Public Understanding of Science, or COPUS, to promote public understanding of science.
Professor Sir George Porter became the president in September 1985. He won the Nobel Prize in Chemistry 1967 along with Manfred Eigen, and Ronald George Wreyford Norrish. When asked about the scientific literacy of Britain, he stated that Britain was the least educated country compared to all the other advanced countries. His idea to solve this problem would be to start scientific education for children at the age of 4. He says his reason for such an early age is because that is the age when children are the most curious, and implementing science at that age will help them gain curiosity towards all disciplines of science. When asked why public ignorance to science matters, his response wasIt matters because among those who are scientifically illiterate are some of those who are in power, people who lead us in politics, in civil service, in the media, in the church, often in industry and sometimes even in education. Think, for example, about the enormous influence of scientific knowledge on one's whole philosophy of life, even one's religion. It is no more permissible for the archbishops of today, who advise their flocks on how to interpret the Scriptures, to ignore the findings of Watson and Crick, than it was right for clerics of the last century to ignore the work of Darwin. Science today is all-pervasive. Without some scientific and technical education, it is becoming impossible even to vote responsibly on matters of health, energy, defense or education. So unless things change, we shall soon live in a country that is backward not only in its technology and standard of living but in its cultural vitality too. It is wrong to suppose that by foregoing technological and scientific education we shall somehow become a nation of artists, writers or philosophers instead. These two aspects of culture have never been divorced from each other throughout our history. Every renaissance, every period that showed a flowering of civilization, advanced simultaneously in the arts and sciences, and in technology too.

Sir Kenneth Durham, former Director of Research at Unilever, on becoming president in August 1987 followed on from Sir George Porter saying that science teachers needed extra pay to overcome the scarcity of mathematics and physics teachers in secondary schools, and that "unless we deal with this as matter of urgency, the outlook for our manufacturing future is bleak". He regretted that headmasters and careers masters had for many years followed 'the cult of Oxbridge' because "it carried more prestige to read Classics at Oxbridge and go into the Civil Service or banking, than to read engineering at, say, Salford, and go into manufacturing industry". He said that reporting of sciences gave good coverage to medical science, but that "nevertheless, editors ought to be sensitive to developments in areas such as solid state physics, astro-physics, colloid science, molecular biology, transmission of stimuli along nerve fibres, and so on, and that newspaper editors were in danger of waiting for disasters before the scientific factors involved in the incidents were explained.

In September 2001 Sir William Stewart, as outgoing president, warned that universities faced "dumbing down" and thatwe can deliver social inclusiveness, and the best universities, but not both from a limited amount of money. We run the risk of doing neither well. Universities are underfunded, and must not be seen simply as a substitute for National Service to keep youngsters off the dole queue... [Adding,] scientists have to be careful and consider the full implications of what they are seeking to achieve. The problem with some clever people is that they find cleverer ways of being stupid.

In the year 2000, Sir Peter Williams had put together a panel to discuss the shortage of physics majors. A physicist called Derek Raine had stated that he has had multiple firms call him up asking for physics majors. The report they made stated that it is critical that they increase the number of physics teachers, or it will have a detrimental effect on the number of future engineers and scientists.

British Science Festival
The Association's major emphasis in recent decades has been on public engagement in science. Its annual meeting, now called the British Science Festival, is the largest public showcase for science in the UK and attracts a great deal of media attention. It is held at UK universities in early September for one week, with visits to science-related local cultural attractions.

The 2010 Festival, held in Birmingham with Aston University as lead University partner, featured a prank event: the unveiling of Dulcis foetidus, a fictional plant purported to emit a pungent odour. An experiment in herd mentality, some audience members were induced into believing they could smell it. 
The Festival has also been the home to protest and debate. In 1970 there were protestors over the use of science for weapons.

Science Communication Conference
The Association organised and held the annual Science Communication Conference for over ten years. It was the largest conference of its kind in the UK, and addressed the key issues facing science communicators. In 2015, the BSA introduced a new series of smaller events for science communicators, designed to address the same issues as the Science Communication Conference but for a more targeted audience.

British Science Week
In addition to the British Science Festival, the British Science Association organises the British Science Week (formerly National Science & Engineering Week), an opportunity for people of all ages to get involved in science, engineering, technology and maths activities, originating as the National Week of Science, Engineering and Technology.

The Association also has a young people's programme, the CREST Awards which seeks to involve school students in science beyond the school curriculum, and to encourage them to consider higher education and careers in science.

Huxley Summit

Named after Thomas Huxley, the Huxley Summit is a leadership event run by the British Science Association, where 250 of the most influential people in the UK are brought together to discuss scientific and social challenges that the UK faces in the 21st century and to develop a link between scientists and non-scientists to ensure that science can be understood by society as a whole. On 8 November 2016, the British Science Association held the very first Huxley Summit at BAFTA, London. The theme of the summit was "Trust in the 21st Century" and how that would affect the future of science, innovation, and business.

Media Fellowship Schemes

The British Science Association's Media Fellowship provides the opportunity for practicing scientists, clinicians, and engineers to spend a period of time working at media outlets such as the Guardian, BBC Breakfast or The Londonist. After their time with the media placement, the fellows attend the British Science Festival which will offer these practitioners valuable working experience with a range of media organizations along with learning from a wide range of public engagement activities and be able to network with academics, journalists and science communicators.

CREST Awards 
CREST Awards is the British Science Association's scheme to encourage students aged 5–19 to get involved with STEM projects and encourage scientific thinking. Awards range from Star Awards (targeted at those aged 5–7) to Gold Awards (targeted to those aged 16–19). Overall, 30,000 awards are undertaken annually. Many students who do CREST Awards, especially Silver and Gold Awards which require 30 and 70 hours of work respectively, enter competitions like the UK Big Bang Fair.

Patrons and Presidents of the British Science Association
Traditionally the president is elected at the meeting usually held in August/September for a one-year term and gives a presidential address upon retiring. The honour of the presidency is traditionally bestowed only once per individual. Written sources that give the year of presidency as a single year generally mean the year in which the presidential address is given. In 1926/1927 the association's patron was King George V and the president was his son Edward, Prince of Wales.  The vice-presidents for the Leeds meeting at this time included City of Leeds Alderman Charles Lupton and his brother, The Rt. Hon. the Lord Mayor of Leeds Hugh Lupton. The husband of the brothers' first cousin once removed - Lord Airedale of Gledhow -   was also a vice-president at the Leeds meeting.

 1831: Charles Wentworth-Fitzwilliam, 5th Earl Fitzwilliam, statistician.
 1832: Rev. William Buckland, palaeontologist
 1833: Rev. Adam Sedgwick, geologist
 1834: Sir Thomas Makdougall Brisbane, astronomer 
 1835: Rev. Humphrey Lloyd, physicist 
 1836: Henry Petty-Fitzmaurice, 3rd Marquess of Lansdowne, statistician 
 1837: William Cavendish, 2nd Earl of Burlington, Chancellor of the University of London 
 1838: Algernon Percy, 4th Duke of Northumberland, Naval officer 
 1839: Canon William Vernon Harcourt, FRS
 1840: John Campbell, 2nd Marquess of Breadalbane, F.R.S.
 1841: Rev. William Whewell, polymath and philosopher of science
 1842: Lord Francis Egerton
 1843: William Parsons, 3rd Earl of Rosse, astronomer 
 1844: Rev. George Peacock, mathematician 
 1845: Sir John F. W. Herschel, astronomer & polymath 
 1846: Sir Roderick Impey Murchison, geologist 
 1847: Sir Robert Harry Inglis
 1848: Spencer Compton, 2nd Marquess of Northampton, geologist 
 1849: Rev. Thomas Romney Robinson, astronomer 

 1850: Sir David Brewster, physicist
 1851: Sir George Biddell Airy, Astronomer Royal 
 1852: Colonel Edward Sabine, Vice-president of the Royal Society 
 1853: William Hopkins FGS, mathematician and geologist
 1854: Dudley Ryder, 2nd Earl of Harrowby FRS
 1855: George Campbell, 8th Duke of Argyll FRS, FRSE, FGS
 1856: Charles D. B. Daubeny MD, FRS, botanist
 1857: Rev. Humphrey Lloyd FRS, FRSE, physicist
 1858: Sir Richard Owen MD, FLS, FGS, naturalist
 1859: Albert, Prince Consort
 1860: John Wrottesley, 2nd Baron Wrottesley FRAS, astronomer
 1861: Sir William Fairbairn, civil engineer
 1862: Rev. Robert Willis FRS, civil engineer
 1863: William Armstrong, engineer and inventor
 1864: Sir Charles Lyell, geologist
 1865: John Phillips FRS, geologist
 1866: William Robert Grove FRS
 1867: Walter Montagu Douglas Scott, 5th Duke of Buccleuch FRS
 1868: Joseph Dalton Hooker MD, FRS, botanist
 1869: Sir George Stokes, 1st Baronet FRS, mathematical physicist
 1870: Thomas Henry Huxley FRS, biologist
 1871: Sir William Thomson FRS, FRSE, physicist
 1872: William Benjamin Carpenter MD, FRS
 1873: Alexander William Williamson FRS, chemist
 1874: John Tyndall FRS, physicist
 1875: Sir John Hawkshaw FRS, civil engineer
 1876: Thomas Andrews MD, FRS, chemist
 1877: Allen Thomson MD, FRS, FRSE
 1878: William Spottiswoode FRS, mathematician
 1879: George James Allman FRS, naturalist
 1880: Sir Andrew Crombie Ramsay FRS, geologist
 1881: John Lubbock, 1st Baron Avebury MP, FRS
 1882: C. W. Siemens FRS, FRSA, engineer
 1883: Arthur Cayley, mathematician
 1884: John William Strutt, 3rd Baron Rayleigh FRS, FRAS, FGS, physicist 
 1885: Lyon Playfair, 1st Baron Playfair MP, FRS, FRSE
 1886: Sir John William Dawson CMG, geologist
 1887: Sir Henry Enfield Roscoe, chemist
 1888: Sir Frederick Bramwell, civil engineer
 1889: Sir William Henry Flower CB, anatomist
 1890: Sir William Huggins FRS, FRAS, FBAS, astronomer
 1891: Sir Frederick August Abel FRS
 1892: Sir Archibald Geikie, geologist
 1893: Sir John Scott Burdon-Sanderson, medical doctor
 1894: Robert Gascoyne-Cecil, 3rd Marquess of Salisbury FRS
 1895: Captain Sir Douglas Strutt Galton FRS, civil engineer
 1896: Joseph Lister, 1st Baron Lister
 1897: John Evans, archaeologist
 1898: Sir William Crookes FRS, chemist and physicist
 1899: Sir Michael Foster, physiologist

 1900: Sir William Turner, anatomist and Vice-Chancellor from 1903 to 1916 of the University of Edinburgh
 1901: Arthur William Rücker FRS, physicist
 1902: Sir James Dewar FRS, chemist and physicist
 1903: Sir Norman Lockyer FRS, astronomer and physicist
 1904: Arthur James Balfour MP, FRS
 1905: Sir George Darwin, older brother of Francis
 1906: Sir Ray Lankester, zoologist
 1907: Sir David Gill CB, astronomer
 1908: Sir Francis Darwin, son of Charles
 1909: Sir J. J. Thomson, physicist
 1910: Rev. Professor Thomas George Bonney, geologist
 1911: Sir William Ramsay, chemist
 1912: Edward Albert Schäfer, physiologist
 1913: Sir Oliver Lodge, physicist
 1914: William Bateson, geneticist
 1915: Sir Arthur Schuster, physicist
 1916–1919: Sir Charles Algernon Parsons, engineer
 1916: Sir Arthur Evans, archaeologist
 1920: William Abbott Herdman, oceanographer
 1921: Sir T. Edward Thorpe, chemist
 1922: Professor Sir Charles Scott Sherrington, neuroscientist
 1923: Professor Sir Ernest Rutherford, physicist
 1924: Major-General Sir David Bruce, microbiologist
 1925: Sir Horace Lamb, physicist
 1926: Edward, Prince of Wales
 1927: Prof Sir Arthur Keith, anatomist and anthropologist
 1928: Sir William Henry Bragg, physicist
 1929: Sir Thomas Henry Holland, geologist
 1930: Frederick Orpen Bower, botanist
 1931: General Jan Christiaan Smuts FRS
 1932: Sir James Alfred Ewing, physicist and Vice-Chancellor from 1916 to 1929 of the University of Edinburgh
 1933: Sir Frederick Gowland Hopkins, Nobel Prize winning (1929) biochemist who discovered vitamins
 1934: Sir James Hopwood Jeans, astronomer
 1935: William Whitehead Watts, geologist
 1936: Josiah Stamp, 1st Baron Stamp, statistician
 1937: Sir Edward Bagnall Poulton, evolutionary biologist
 1938: Robert Strutt, 4th Baron Rayleigh, physicist and son of Nobel Prize–winning John William Strutt, 3rd Baron Rayleigh
 1939–1946: Sir Albert Seward, geologist
 1946–1947: Sir Henry Dale, physiologist
 1947–48: Sir Henry Tizard, chemist and inventor
 1948–49: Sir E. John Russell, agriculturalist
 1949–50: Sir Harold Hartley, physical chemist

 1950–51: Prince Philip, Duke of Edinburgh
 1951–52: Archibald Vivian Hill, physiologist
 1952–53: Sir Edward Victor Appleton, Nobel Prize winning (1947) physicist
 1953–54: Edgar Adrian, 1st Baron Adrian, neuroscientist
 1954–55: Sir Robert Robinson, chemist
 1955–56: Sir Raymond Priestley, geologist and Vice-Chancellor from 1938 to 1952 of the University of Birmingham
 1956–57: Patrick Blackett, Baron Blackett, physicist
 1957–58: Alexander Fleck, 1st Baron Fleck, industrial chemist
 1958–59: Sir James Gray, zoologist
 1959–60: Sir George Paget Thomson, physicist
 1960–61: Sir Wilfrid Le Gros Clark, primatologist and palaeoanthropologist
 1961–62: Sir John Cockcroft CBE, Nobel Prize winning (1951) physicist
 1962–63: Eric Ashby, Baron Ashby, Vice-Chancellor from 1950 to 1959 of Queen's University Belfast
 1963–64: Russell Brain, 1st Baron Brain, neurologist
 1964–65: Sir Cyril Norman Hinshelwood, Nobel Prize winning (1956) chemist
 1965–66: Sir Joseph Hutchinson, biologist
 1966–67: Willis Jackson, Baron Jackson of Burnley, technologist and electrical engineer
 1967–68: Dame Kathleen Lonsdale, physicist who discovered the cyclic nature of benzene in 1929
 1968–69: Sir Peter Medawar, zoologist and immunologist
 1969–70: Alexander R. Todd, Baron Todd, Nobel Prize winning (1957) biochemist known for nucleotides and coenzymes
 1970–71: Sir Alexander Cairncross, economist
 1971–72: Sir Vivian Fuchs FRS, explorer
 1972–73: Sir Kingsley Charles Dunham, geologist and mineralogist
 1973–74: Sir John Kendrew CBE, Nobel Prize winning (1962) biochemist who discovered the structure of myoglobin
 1974–75: Sir Bernard Lovell, astronomer
 1975–76: John Baker, Baron Baker OBE, structural engineer known for limit state design
 1976–77: Sir Andrew Huxley, Nobel Prize winning (1963) physiologist, known for discovering nerve action potentials
 1977–78: Prof Dorothy Hodgkin, Nobel Prize winning (1964) chemist
 1978–79: Frank Kearton, Baron Kearton OBE, 
 1979–80: Frederick Dainton, Baron Dainton
 1980–81: HRH the Duke of Kent
 1981–82: Prof Sir Charles Frederick Carter, economist
 1982–83: Sir Basil John Mason CB, Director-General from 1965 to 1983 of the Met Office
 1983–84: Sir Alastair Pilkington, inventor
 1984–85: Prof Sir Hans Kornberg, biochemist
 1985–86: Prof George Porter, Baron Porter of Luddenham, Nobel Prize winning (1967) chemist
 1986–87 Sir Kenneth Durham, Chairman from 1982 to 1986 of Unilever
 1987–88: Sir Walter Bodmer, geneticist
 1988–89: Sir Samuel Edwards, physicist
 1989–90: Claus Moser, Baron Moser, Director from 1967 to 1978 of the Central Statistical Office
 1990–91: Sir Denis Rooke
 1991–92 Sir David Attenborough
 1992–93: Sir David Weatherall, haemotologist
 1993–94: Dame Anne McLaren, IVF biologist
 1994–95: Sir Martin Rees, Baron Rees of Ludlow FRS, astrophysicist
 1995–96: Ronald Oxburgh, Baron Oxburgh, geologist and Rector of Imperial College London from 1993 to 2000
 1996–97: Sir Derek Roberts CBE, electronics engineer, and Provost of UCL from 1989 to 1999
 1997–98 Prof Colin Blakemore, neuroscientist
 1998–99: Sir Richard Sykes, biochemist and chief executive from 1993 to 1997 of Glaxo
 1999–2000: Anne, Princess Royal

 2000–01: Sir William Stewart, Government Chief Scientific Adviser from 1990 to 1995
 2001–02: Sir Howard Newby, sociologist
 2002–03: Sir Peter Williams CBE, physicist
 2003–04: Dame Julia Higgins
 2004–05: Prof Robert Winston, Lord Winston of Hammersmith
 2005–06: Frances Cairncross CBE, economist
 2006–07: John Browne, Lord Browne of Madingley
 2007–08: Sir David King, Government Chief Scientific Adviser from 2000 to 2008
 2009–10: Robert May, Baron May of Oxford

 2010–11: David Sainsbury, Lord Sainsbury of Turville
 2011-12: Professor Dame Jocelyn Bell Burnell FRS, FRSE
 2012-13: John Krebs, Baron Krebs FRS
 2013-14: Lisa Jardine CBE, historian
 2014-15: Sir Paul Nurse FRS, President from 2010 to 2015 of the Royal Society, and joint winner of the 2001 Nobel Prize in Physiology or Medicine (for work on cell cycle division)
 2015-16 Dame Athene Donald FRS, physicist and Master since 2014 of Churchill College, Cambridge
 2016-17: Dame Nancy Rothwell DBE DL FRS FMedSci FBPhS, physiologist and President and Vice-Chancellor of the University of Manchester
 2017-18: Dame Uta Frith FRS, developmental psychologist
 2018-19: Professor Jim Al-Khalili FRS, physicist and broadcaster
 2019-20: Professor Alice Roberts anatomist and broadcaster

 2020-21: Ara Darzi, Baron Darzi of Denham
 2021-22: Maggie Aderin-Pocock
 2022-23: Anne-Marie Imafidon

List of annual meetings
 1831 (1st meeting) York, England.
 1832 (2nd meeting) Oxford, England.

 1833 (3rd meeting) Cambridge, England. 
 1834 (4th meeting) Edinburgh, Scotland. 
 1835 (5th meeting) Dublin, Ireland.
 1836 (6th meeting) Bristol, England. 
 1837 (7th meeting) Liverpool, England. 
 1838 (8th meeting) Newcastle upon Tyne, England. 
 1839 (9th meeting) Birmingham, England. 
 1840 (10th meeting) Glasgow, Scotland.
 1841 (11th meeting) Plymouth, England.
 1842 (12th meeting) Manchester.
 1843 (13th meeting) Cork, Ireland.
 1844 (14th meeting) York, England.
 1845 (15th meeting) Cambridge, England.
 1846 (16th meeting) Southampton, England.
 1847 (17th meeting) Oxford, England.
 1848 (18th meeting) Swansea, Wales.
 1849 (19th meeting) Birmingham, England.
 1850 (20th meeting) Edinburgh, Scotland.
 1851 (21st meeting) Ipswich, England.
 1852 (22nd meeting) Belfast, Northern Ireland.
 1853 (23rd meeting) Hull, England.
 1854 (24th meeting) Liverpool, England.
 1855 (25th meeting) Glasgow, Scotland.
 1856 (26th meeting) Cheltenham, England.
 1857 (27th meeting) Dublin, Ireland.
 1858 (28th meeting) Leeds, England.
 1859 (29th meeting) Aberdeen, Scotland.
 1860 (30th meeting) Oxford, England. 
 1861 (31st meeting) Manchester, England. 
 1862 (32nd meeting) Cambridge, England. 
 1863 (33rd meeting) Newcastle upon Tyne, England. 
 1864 (34th meeting) Bath, England. 
 1865 (35th meeting) Birmingham, England. 
 1866 (36th meeting) Nottingham, England. 
 1867 (37th meeting) Dundee, Scotland. 
 1868 (38th meeting) Norwich, England. 
 1869 (39th meeting) Exeter, England. 
 1870 (40th meeting) Liverpool, England. 
 1871 (41st meeting) Edinburgh, Scotland. 
 1872 (42nd meeting) Brighton, England. 
 1873 (43rd meeting) Bradford, England. 
 1874 (44th meeting) Belfast, Northern Ireland. 
 1875 (45th meeting) Bristol, England. 
 1876 (46th meeting) Glasgow, Scotland. 
 1877 (47th meeting) Plymouth, England. 
 1878 (48th meeting) Dublin, Ireland. 
 1879 (49th meeting) Sheffield, England. 
 1880 (50th meeting) Swansea, Wales. 
 1881 (51st meeting) York, England. 
 1882 (52nd meeting) Southampton, England. 
 1883 (53rd meeting) Southport, England. 
 1884 (54th meeting) Montreal, Quebec, Canada. 
 1885 (55th meeting) Aberdeen, Scotland. 
 1886 (56th meeting) Birmingham, England. 
 1887 (57th meeting) Manchester, England. 
 1888 (58th meeting) Bath, England. 
 1889 (59th meeting) Newcastle upon Tyne, England. 
 1890 (60th meeting) Leeds, England. 
 1891 (61st meeting) Cardiff, Wales. 
 1892 (62nd meeting) Edinburgh, Scotland. 
 1893 (63rd meeting) Nottingham, England. 
 1894 (64th meeting) Oxford, England. 
 1895 (65th meeting) Ipswich, England. 
 1896 (66th meeting) Liverpool, England. 
 1897 (67th meeting) Toronto, Ontario, Canada. 
 1898 (68th meeting) Bristol, England. 
 1899 (69th meeting) Dover, England. 
 1900 (70th meeting) Bradford, England.
 1901 (71st meeting) Glasgow, Scotland.
 1902 (72nd meeting) Belfast, Northern Ireland.
 1903 (73rd meeting) Southport, England.
 1904 (74th meeting) Cambridge, England.
 1905 (75th meeting) Various, South Africa.
 1906 (76th meeting) York, England.
 1907 (77th meeting) Leicester, England.
 1908 (78th meeting) Dublin, Ireland.
 1909 (79th meeting) Winnipeg, Manitoba, Canada.
 1910 (80th meeting) Sheffield, England.
 1911 (81st meeting) Portsmouth, England.
 1912 (82nd meeting) Dundee, Scotland.
 1913 (83rd meeting) Birmingham, England.
 1914 (84th meeting) Various, Australia.
 1915 (85th meeting) Manchester, England.
 1916 (86th meeting) Newcastle upon Tyne, England.
 1917 No meeting
 1918 No meeting
 1919 (87th meeting) Bournemouth, England.
 1920 (88th meeting) Cardiff, Wales.
 1921 (89th meeting) Edinburgh, Scotland.
 1922 (90th meeting) Hull, England.
 1923 (91st meeting) Liverpool, England.
 1924 (92nd meeting) Toronto, Ontario, Canada.
 1925 (93rd meeting) Southampton, England.
 1926 (94th meeting) Oxford, England.
 1927 (95th meeting) Leeds, England.
 1928 (96th meeting) Glasgow, Scotland.
 1929 (97th meeting) Various, South Africa.
 1930 (98th meeting) Bristol, England.
 1931 (99th meeting) London, England.
 1932 (100th meeting) York, England.
 1933 (101st meeting) Leicester, England.
 1934 (102nd meeting) Aberdeen, Scotland.
 1935 (103rd meeting) Norwich, England.
 1936 (104th meeting) Blackpool, England.
 1937 (105th meeting) Nottingham, England.
 1938 (106th meeting) Cambridge, England.
 1939 (107th meeting) Dundee, Scotland.
 1940 No meeting
 1941 No meeting
 1942 No meeting
 1943 No meeting
 1944 No meeting
 1945 No meeting
 1946 No full meeting (An abbreviated one-day meeting was held in London on 20 July 1946; Sir Henry Dale was elected the new president.)
 1947 (109th meeting) Dundee, Scotland. 
 1948 (110th meeting) Brighton, England.
 1949 (111th meeting) Newcastle upon Tyne, England.
 1950 (112th meeting) Birmingham, England.
 1951 (113th meeting) Edinburgh, Scotland.
 1952 (114th meeting) Belfast, Northern Ireland.
 1953 (115th meeting) Liverpool, England.
 1954 (116th meeting) Oxford, England.
 1955 (117th meeting) Bristol, England.
 1956 (118th meeting) Sheffield, England.
 1957 (119th meeting) Dublin, Ireland.
 1958 (120th meeting) Glasgow, Scotland.
 1959 (121st meeting) York, England.
 1960 (122nd meeting) Cardiff, England.
 1961 (123rd meeting) Norwich, England.
 1962 (124th meeting) Manchester, England.
 1963 (125th meeting) Aberdeen, Scotland.
 1964 (126th meeting) Southampton, England.
 1965 (127th meeting) Cambridge, England.
 1966 (128th meeting) Nottingham, England.
 1967 (129th meeting) Leeds, England.
 1968 (130th meeting) Dundee, Scotland.
 1969 (131st meeting) Exeter, England.
 1970 (132nd meeting) Durham, England.
 1971 (133rd meeting) Swansea, Wales.
 1972 (134th meeting) Leicester, England.
 1973 (135th meeting) Canterbury, England.
 1974 (136th meeting) Stirling, Scotland.
 1975 (137th meeting) Guildford, England.
 1976 (138th meeting) Lancaster, England.
 1977 (139th meeting) Birmingham, England.
 1978 (140th meeting) Bath, England.
 1979 (141st meeting) Edinburgh, Scotland.
 1980 (142nd meeting) Salford, England. 
 1981 (143rd meeting) York, England.
 1982 (144th meeting) Liverpool, England.
 1983 (145th meeting) Brighton, England.
 1984 (146th meeting) Norwich, England.
 1985 (147th meeting) Glasgow, Scotland.
 1986 (148th meeting) Bristol, England.
 1987 (149th meeting) Belfast, Northern Ireland.
 1988 (150th meeting) Oxford, England.
 1989 (151st meeting) Sheffield, England.
 1990 (151st meeting) Swansea, Wales.
 1991 (152nd meeting) Plymouth, England.
 1992 (153rd meeting) Southampton, England.
 1993 (154th meeting) Keele, England.
 1994 (155th meeting) Loughborough, England.
 1995 (156th meeting) Newcastle upon Tyne, England.
 1996 (157th meeting) Birmingham, England.
 1997 (158th meeting) Leeds, England.
 1998 (159th meeting) Cardiff, Wales.
 1999 (160th meeting) Sheffield, England.
 2000 (161st meeting) London, England.
 2001 (162nd meeting) Glasgow, Scotland.
 2002 (163rd meeting) Leicester, England.
 2003 (164th meeting) Salford, England.
 2004 (165th meeting) Exeter, England.
 2005 (166th meeting) Dublin, Ireland.
 2006 (167th meeting) Norwich, England.
 2007 (168th meeting) York, England.
 2008 (169th meeting) Liverpool, England.
 2009 (170th meeting) Guildford, England.
 2010 (171st meeting) Birmingham, England.
 2011 (172nd meeting) Bradford, England.
 2012 (173rd meeting) Aberdeen, Scotland.

 2013 (174th meeting) Newcastle upon Tyne, England.
 2014 (175th meeting) Birmingham, England.
 2015 (176th meeting) Bradford, England
 2016 (177th meeting) Swansea, Wales
 2017 (178th meeting) Brighton, England
 2018 (179th meeting) Hull, England
 2019 (180th meeting) Coventry, England

Structure
The organisation is administered from the Wellcome Wolfson Building at the Science Museum, London in South Kensington in Kensington and Chelsea, within a few feet of the northern boundary with the City of Westminster (in which most of the neighbouring Imperial College London is resident).

See also
 1860 Oxford evolution debate
 American Association for the Advancement of Science
 Association of British Science Writers
 Café Scientifique
 EuroScience
 Glossary of astronomy
 Glossary of biology
 Glossary of chemistry
 Glossary of engineering
 Glossary of physics
 Guildhall Lectures
 National Science Week
 Royal Institution
 Royal Society
 Scandinavian Scientist Conference (1839–1936)
 Science Abstracts
 Science Festival

References

External links
 British Science Association
 British Science Festival
 British Science Association: Our history
Digitised Reports 1833–1937, Biodiversity Heritage Library
 Reports of the meetings 1877–90 are available on Gallica
The University of Toronto Archives and Record Management Services holds some papers of the British Association for the Advancement of Science.

Video clips
 British Science Association YouTube channel

1831 establishments in the United Kingdom
Royal Borough of Kensington and Chelsea
Science advocacy organizations
Science and technology in London
Science education in the United Kingdom
Science festivals
Scientific societies based in the United Kingdom
Scientific organizations established in 1831